Rhinegold Publishing is an independent publisher of music magazines, music yearbooks and education resources, founded in 1977. Among Rhinegold's publications are Choir & Organ and Classical Music Magazine.

In September 2010, Rhinegold Education, comprising the music and drama study guides and related educational books previously owned by Rhinegold Publishing, was acquired by London-based music publisher Music Sales Ltd. The acquisition included the rights to develop, publish and sell current and future books under the ‘Rhinegold Education’ brand.

Choir & Organ 

Choir & Organ ( Choir and Organ) is a magazine in the areas of choral music and organ music. It is published by Rhinegold Publishing. There are six issues each year.

References

External links 

 Official website
 Rhinegold Education

1977 establishments in England
Publishing companies established in 1977
Companies based in the London Borough of Camden
Book publishing companies of the United Kingdom
Educational publishing companies of the United Kingdom
Music publishing companies of the United Kingdom